Tomcats Screaming Outside is the only solo studio album by British musician Roland Orzabal from the band Tears for Fears, and was released on 2 April 2001. Although Orzabal had made two albums solely with Tears for Fears moniker in the 1990s (following the departure of bandmate Curt Smith), Elemental and Raoul and the Kings of Spain, this was the first recording to be released under his own name.

Background
In a 2000 interview, Orzabal commented on his influences for the album: "I started out with an absolute concrete vision of where I wanted to go so I started with a very different rhythm approach, with drum and bass/jungle...and I ended up with something that wasn't the original plan."

This album was Orzabal's last to feature contributions from Alan Griffiths, who co-wrote most of the tracks on this album as well as the previous two Tears for Fears albums. The album was given a low-key release and did not chart, but earned some critical acclaim for its clever melding of pop songwriting and drum and bass, ambient techno and trip hop textures. Dan Gennoe claimed in Amazon.com's editorial review: "Solo album or not, Tomcats Screaming Outside is the best Tears for Fears album in a decade."

Two outtake demos from the album's sessions, "Deep Seeded Blindness" and "Cold Planet", have been made available online.

The US release of the album (on Gold Circle Records) had the unfortunate coincidence to be released on September 11, 2001 the same day the United States experienced its worst-ever terrorist attack, and drew little notice outside Tears for Fears' core fan base.

Track listing
All songs written by Roland Orzabal/Alan Griffiths, except where indicated.
 "Ticket to the World" – 5:48
 "Low Life" – 4:36 (Orzabal)
 "Hypnoculture" – 3:13 (Orzabal)
 "Bullets for Brains" – 4:08
 "For the Love of Cain" – 4:06 (Orzabal)
 "Under Ether" – 5:51
 "Day By Day By Day By Day By Day" – 4:35
 "Dandelion" – 3:03
 "Hey Andy!" – 4:25 (Orzabal)
 "Kill Love" – 5:40
 "Snowdrop" – 4:23
 "Maybe Our Days Are Numbered" – 4:47

Singles
"Low Life" was the first single from the album. Plans to release the single in the UK were scrapped at the last minute, although it did see a commercial release in mainland Europe. "Low Life" was also played in the US on adult alternative radio. "For the Love of Cain" was planned as the second single release from the album, but it was cancelled since the first single had no chart success in Germany. Only a limited number of copies were sold through Orzabal's official website.

"Low Life" (12 March 2001)
"Low Life" (Album Version) – 4:37
"Low Life" (Supersub Mix) – 4:58
"Low Life" (President Who? Mix) – 4:50
"Low Life" (Radio Edit) – 4:07

"For the Love of Cain" (August 2001)
"For the Love of Cain (Radio Edit) – 3:33
"Day By Day By Day By Day By Day" (Album Version) – 4:35
"Low Life" (Album Version) – 4:37
"Low Life" (Video) – 4:35

Personnel
Roland Orzabal  - guitar, keyboards, programming, vocals
Alan Griffiths - guitar, keyboards, programming
David Sutton - bass
Nick D'Virgilio - drums

 technical staff 
Mark O'Donoughue - engineer, mixing
Curtis Evans - design

References

External links
Interview with Orzabal in September 2000  published in Lexicon Magazine and Sorted Magazine

2001 debut albums
Drum and bass albums
Eagle Records albums